Marvel Select is a line of action figures from the Marvel Universe and Marvel Cinematic Universe manufactured by Diamond Select Toys.

Diamond Select uses the "Select" label for other brands, including Universal Monsters, Star Trek and The Munsters, to indicate the 1:10 scale and comes in similar packaging.

Figures are sculpted in a strict 1:10 scale. Larger characters can stand as tall as 9-10 inches.

History
At its inception in 2002, the line was designed, sold, and marketed by Diamond Select Toys. Development and production was handled by Toy Biz until the company went defunct. Figures were originally limited to Ultimate Marvel and Marvel Knights. Focus was on sculpting over articulation and included large display bases and accessories, sometimes an additional figure, which necessitated large display packaging in the beginning. These pack-ins helped establish a collector-targeted line, although the dioramas were minimized or eliminated once the line began to tackle larger characters such as the Hulk. Packaging features distinctive decoration with comic artwork of each character.

Released
Ultimate Spider-Man with a burglar webbed to a wall base
Punisher with smashed pinball machine, arsenal of weapons and thug victim figure
Elektra with castle tower display base, ninja arsenal and additional hand and leg attachments
Ultimate Captain America with flag, shield and WWII battlefield base
Black Widow (Yelena Belova) with cave wall base, pistol, rifle, knife and storage drums
Origin Wolverine with forest display and wolves
Black Cat with apartment wall base, safe, jewels and unarticulated crawling Spider-Man
Ultimate Iron Man with removable forearm armor and recharging station
Ultimate Hulk with printed scenic city base (Black/Gray initial release/matte gray reissue)
Ultimate Venom (classic Venom variant) with an unmasked Spider-Man webbed to the wall base and symbiote jar
Ultimate Wolverine with injured Magneto
Classic Green Goblin with goblin glider, pumpkin bomb and tied-up unmasked unarticulated Spider-Man accessory
Ultimate Thor with Mjölnir and defeated Giant-Man base
Dr. Doom with goblet hand, pistol and detailed throne with banners
Dr. Octopus with removable flexible tentacles and articulated Spider-Man
Here Comes Tomorrow Phoenix (fiery transparent Phoenix variant) with flame baseEmma Frost (diamond transparent Emma variant) with detailed fireplace and mantle display baseBlack Costume Spider-Man with rooftop gargoyle ledgeShe-Hulk with crushed car (ToyFare poll winner/convention tour exclusive)Ultimate Carnage with Gwen Stacy corpseThanos with alternate Infinity Gauntlet hand and Death (with separate face-mask)Days of Future Past Wolverine with Kate Pryde and wanted poster ruins baseUatu the Watcher with moon standSpider-Woman  (first appearance variant with full cowl) with detachable web shot, Hydra Agents and Hydra mansion baseSpider-Woman (Julia Carpenter) 2006 SDCC exclusive with Hydra Agents and Hydra mansion baseMoon Knight with crescent blades and Khonshu statueCloak & Dagger with light knivesIron Spider with rooftop gargoyle ledge (ToyFare exclusive repaint of the Black Costume Spider-Man)Mephisto with throneGhost Rider with fiery highway baseAlien Legends: Skrull and Brood 2-packZombie Spider-Man with detachable leg and Silver Surfer pieces baseZombie Colonel America with removable skull, shield and Silver Surfer pieces baseZombie Hulk with Silver Surfer pieces baseSkrull Elektra and Skrull repaints (2010 SDCC exclusive)Modern Costume Thor with Mjölnir and Asgard baseIncredible Hulk with rubble-strewn baseIron Man with blast-off baseStealth Iron Man (blue Iron Man repaint) with blast-off baseWhat If...?'' Captain America (red-white-and-blue Iron Man repaint) with blast-off base (Big Bad Toy Store exclusive)
 Captain America (Bucky Barnes) (unmasked variant) with pistol, canteen, sheathed blade, and eagle ledge
Red Hulk with rubble-strewn base (Big Bad Toy Store exclusive)
Arachne from Best of Marvel Select Series 3, with Hydra Agents and Hydra mansion base
Skrull Three-Pack from Best of Marvel Select Series 3
Captain Marvel (Genis-Vell variant and Genis-Vell variant with Kree navy uniform with pistol) with crashed Skrull ship base
Anti-Venom with symbiote base
Wolverine (first appearance variant) with Weapon X base
Brown Costume Wolverine with samurai armor base (Big Bad Toy Store exclusive)
Unmasked Brown Costume Wolverine]] with samurai armor base (Phat Collectibles/Hastings Entertainment exclusive)
Marvel Girl (Rachel Summers variant) with half of the Xavier mansion gate
X-Men Origins: Wolverine: Wolverine with dumpster
Sabretooth (first appearance variant) with damaged Weapon X facility base
First Appearance Sabretooth with damaged Weapon X facility base (CMDStore.com exclusive)
Daredevil (unmasked variant) with cathedral roof top
Spider-Man with destroyed car base
Iron Man 2: Iron Man Mark VI with armory base
Iron Man 2: Iron Man Mark IV with armory base (Borders exclusive)
Iron Man 2: War Machine blue arc reactor, with Hammer armory base
Iron Man 2: War Machine red arc reactor, with Hammer armory base, (Borders exclusive)
The Thing with printed group scene Fantastic Four base
Abomination with destroyed ground base
Cyclops (X-Factor variant) with interchangeable mask-less head and danger room base
Deadpool (unmasked variant) with rifle, pistol, two swords and two sais with shot-up back alley base
Magneto (no helmet variant) with destroyed Xavier mansion base
Juggernaut (no helmet variant) with printed rubble base
Thor: Loki with Heimdall's sword and half of Bifröst gate base
Thor: Thor with Mjölnir and half of Bifröst gate base
Gambit (long-haired variant) with interchangeable hands, charged-cards, staff and danger room base
Captain America: The First Avenger: Captain America with shield, pistol and half of a Cosmic Cube base
Captain America: The First Avenger: Red Skull with pistol and half of a Cosmic Cube base
Hawkeye with perched Wasp arrow and slain Ultron base (Disney Store exclusive)
Classic Thor with rock base (Disney Store exclusive)
Captain America with platform base (Disney Store exclusive)
Black Widow with Ant-Man and slain Ultron base (Disney Store exclusive)
Colossus with danger room base
Modern Green Goblin with glider base
The Avengers: Hulk
The Avengers: Hawkeye with Pershing Square railing base
The Avengers: Chitauri Footsoldier with Pershing Square railing base
The Avengers: Iron Man Mark VI with interchangeable hands, removable mask and armory base - re-issue of Iron Man 2: Iron Man Mark VI
The Amazing Spider-Man: Lizard
The Amazing Spider-Man: Spider-Man with interchangeable hands and awning base
The Amazing Spider-Man: Unmasked Spider-Man with interchangeable head, hands and awning base (Disney Store exclusive)
The Amazing Spider-Man: Metallic Spider-Man with interchangeable hands and awning base (Disney Store exclusive)
Ultron with Ant-Man and Wasp (fallen heroes) base
Storm (short hair variant) with torch attachment Danger Room base
Unleashed Hulk (Disney Store exclusive)
Flash Thompson as (Agent) Venom with revolver pistol, modern pistol and wreckage base (Disney Store exclusive)
Lizard with brick wall base (Disney Store exclusive)
Barbarian Hulk
Rhino
Venom (Eddie Brock) with interchangeable heads/hands and multiple headed attachment
Nightcrawler with teleportation base
Iron Man 3: Iron Man Mark 42 with interchangeable unmasked head, alternate hands and armory base
Iron Man 3: War Machine with interchangeable unmasked head, shoulder cannon and armory base
Iron Man 3: Iron Patriot with interchangeable unmasked head, shoulder cannon and armory base (Disney Store exclusive)
Iron Man 3: Iron Man Battle damaged Mark 42 with interchangeable unmasked head, alternate hands and armory base (Disney Store exclusive)
The Wolverine: Wolverine with two interchangeable heads, bone claw hands, adamantium claw hands and plain hands and a sword
Thor: The Dark World: Thor with Mjolnir and half of a rocky display base
Silver Surfer with surfboard, energy blasts, infinity gauntlet and energy trail base
Winter Soldier with pistol, machine gun, sniper rifle, crate and shattered window display base (Disney Store exclusive)
Thor: The Dark World: Jane Foster with interchangeable aether possessed head, dark elf sword and half of a rocky display base
The Superior Spider-Man with display base depicting the aftermath of a battle with the Sinister Six (Disney Store exclusive)
Captain America: The Winter Soldier: Captain America in stealth suit with helicarrier-inspired display base
Captain America: The Winter Soldier: Unmasked Battle Damaged Captain America in stealth suit with interchangeable full cowl head and helicarrier-inspired display base (Disney Store exclusive)
The Amazing Spider-Man 2: Unmasked Spider-Man with interchangeable head and hands with web swings (Disney Store exclusive)
The Amazing Spider-Man 2: Spider-Man with interchangeable hands, web swings, fire helmet and fire hose nozzle
Savage Hulk with rubble-strewn base (Disney Store exclusive)
Black Widow with Ant-Man and slain Ultron base (Black repaint of Disney Store exclusive)
Captain America: The Winter Soldier: Falcon with battle damaged helicarrier-inspired display base
The Amazing Spider-Man 2: Spider-Man with interchangeable right hand, web swings and awning base
Electro with transformer tower display base (Disney Store exclusive), also available in two-pack with Spider-Man re-issue and two transformer towers
Zombie Magneto with rubble base and severed green goblin limb
Bleeding Edge Iron Man with a demolished plane wing display base (Disney Store exclusive)
Captain America with unmasked interchangeable head and platform base (Disney Store exclusive)
The Mighty Thor with an alternate head and fist, Mjölnir, spinning Mjölnir accessory and peg stand (Disney Store exclusive)
Cable with a defeated Stryfe base, pistol, shoulder mounted gun, oversized gun, two large guns and a knife.
Carnage (Cletus Kasady) with interchangeable heads and tendrils
Avengers: Age of Ultron: Hulk
Hulkbuster Iron Man (Disney Store exclusive)
Ant-Man: Unmasked Ant-Man (Scott Lang) with interchangeable helmet, hands and unarticulated Ant-Man figurine (Disney Store exclusive)
Ant-Man: Ant-Man (Scott Lang) with interchangeable hands and unarticulated Ant-Man figurine
Avengers: Age of Ultron: Thor repaint from Thor: The Dark World with half of rubble base
Avengers: Age of Ultron: Black Widow with two escrima sticks, pistol and half of rubble base
Zombie Sabretooth with rubble base featuring a damaged chunk of Green Goblin’s Goblin Glider
Doctor Strange with Eye of Agamotto amulet, energy blast and Sanctum Sanctorum window base
The Spectacular Spider-Man with unmasked head, loose mask, interchangeable hands and camera (Disney Store exclusive)
Black Panther with tree base (Disney Store exclusive)
Avenging Captain America with Hydra base (Disney Store exclusive)
Captain America: Civil War: Iron Man with interchangeable hands and part of Avengers Facility base
Captain America: Civil War: Captain America with interchangeable hands and part of Avengers Facility base
Captain America: Civil War: Winter Soldier with rifle, interchangeable hands and part of Avengers Facility base
Captain America: Civil War: Unmasked Captain America with interchangeable hands and part of Avengers Facility base (Disney Store exclusive)
Doctor Strange Dr. Charles Benton/Asmodeus Masked variant with Eye of Agamotto amulet, energy blast and Sanctum Sanctorum window base. (Disney Store exclusive)
Destroyer with interchangeable Odin head and sword
Doctor Strange: Doctor Strange with interchangeable hands, magic sphere and Sanctum Sanctorum window base
Star-Lord with interchangeable unmasked head and hand, two blasters, rock fragment, jet-flame boots, flight stand and interlocking environment base (Disney Store exclusive)
Groot with interlocking environment base (Disney Store exclusive)
Drax with battle axe, sword, interchangeable hands and interlocking environment base (Disney Store exclusive)
Gamora & Rocket Raccoon with three sets of interchangeable hands, sword, knife, laser rifle, two laser pistols; Rocket includes two blasters with the interlocking environment base (Disney Store exclusive)
Lady Deadpool with two katanas, shotgun, waist knife, bazooka, interchangeable hands and base with Headpool.
Planet Hulk with axe and shield (Disney Store exclusive)
Spider-Man: Homecoming: Spider-Man with interchangeable hands and rooftop base.
Spider-Man: Homecoming: Unmasked Spider-Man with interchangeable hands and rooftop base. (Disney Store exclusive)
Marvel's Daredevil: Daredevil with interchangeable hands, detachable baton, elevator base and flight stand
Guardians of the Galaxy Vol. 2: Star-Lord & Rocket Raccoon with blaster
Guardians of the Galaxy Vol. 2: Drax the Destroyer & Groot with knives
Spider-Gwen with interchangeable hands, defeated robot base and unmasked head
Thor Ragnarok: Gladiator Hulk with interchangeable head and hands with axe and hammer
Thor Ragnarok: Thor with interchangeable hands, swords and lightning effect piece
Thanos with interchangeable head (Disney Store exclusive)
Black Panther: Black Panther with vibranium rock display base and interchangeable hands
Beast with hanging bar attachment danger room base
Avengers: Infinity War: Iron Man Mk50 with interchangeable hands, two sets of nanotech handblades and nano repulsor cannon (Disney Store exclusive)
Venom (Eddie Brock) with interchangeable heads, hands and backpiece tendril attachment (Disney Store exclusive)
Avengers: Infinity War: Spider-Man Iron Spider costume with interchangeable hands
Avengers: Infinity War: Thor & Groot with interchangeable hands, stormbreaker and Groot's handheld videogame
Avengers: Infinity War: Captain America with grass display base, interchangeable hands and shields
Ant-Man and the Wasp: Wasp (Hope van Dyne) with interchangeable hands and miniature Scott Lang Ant-Man & The Wasp figures (Disney Store exclusive)
Ant-Man and the Wasp: Ant-Man (Scott Lang) with interchangeable hands and miniature Hope van Dyne Wasp and Hank Pym as Ant-Man and Sub-Atomic Ant-Man figures (Disney Store exclusive)
Rogue with interchangeable hands, mounted gun attachment danger room base
Psylocke with psy-blade, psy-energy mask effect, interchangeable head and hands and wing chun dummy attachment danger room base
Sandman with interchangeable hands, sand spiked hammer, sand spiked flail with sandstorm base
Captain Marvel: Captain Marvel (Carol Danvers) in Starforce uniform with interchangeable cowl head, hands, blast-off base and Goose
Spider-Man: Far From Home: Spider-Man with Union Jack flag pole and interchangeable hands (Disney Store exclusive)
Avengers: Endgame: Hulk with interchangeable hands (Disney Store exclusive)
Captain Marvel: Captain Marvel (Carol Danvers) with interchangeable cowl head, hands, energy blasts, two flight stands and Goose (Disney Store exclusive)
Avengers: Endgame: Thanos with interchangeable Infinity Gauntlet and blade (Disney Store exclusive)
Avengers: Endgame: Nano-Gauntlet Hulk with interchangeable nano-gauntlet and hands
Avengers: Endgame: Iron Man Mk85 with interchangeable hands, nano-gauntlet and snapping fingers hand
Spider-Man with spider-drone and web shield
Taskmaster with sword, shield, pistol, bow and arrows, interchangeable head and hand (Disney Store exclusive)
Black Widow:  Taskmaster with sword, shield, bow and arrows and interchangeable hands.
Carnage (Cletus Kasady) with interchangeable heads and tendrils (Disney Store exclusive)
Immortal Hulk with interchangeable head and hands
The Falcon and the Winter Soldier: Captain America (Sam Wilson) with wing pack, shield and alternate hands
Winter Soldier: (repaint inspired by The Falcon and the Winter Soldier) with pistol, machine gun, sniper rifle, crate and window diorama (Disney Store exclusive)
Agent of Asgard Loki and Kid Loki with staff, sword, dagger, staff and interchangeable arms (Disney Store exclusive)
Iron Man MKVII Silver Centurion armor with interchangeable unmasked heads, hands and blast effects
Human Torch with alternate Toro head, fire effects and flame base
Titanium Man with interchangeable head and hands
WandaVision: Scarlet Witch with interchangeable head, hands and hex effects
Hawkeye (repaint of Avenging Hawkeye with a new color scheme inspired by the Hawkeye Disney+ series) with alternate bandaged head, interchangeable pistol grip hand, crossbow pistol, compound bow and Lucky the Pizza Dog (Disney Store exclusive)
Spider-Man: No Way Home: Black and Gold Spider-Man with alternate hands and 2 web lines (Disney Store exclusive)
Moon Knight (repaint of the previous Moon Knight with a new color scheme inspired by the Moon Knight Disney+ series) with 2 crescent darts and Egyptian temple base (Disney Store exclusive)
Miles Morales: with alternate head, alternate hands, spider-sense attachment, 2 web lines and Spider-Ham figurine (Disney Store exclusive)
Black Panther (repaint of Black Panther with a new color scheme inspired by the comics) with re-used wall base from Black Widow (Disney Store exclusive'')
Beta Ray Bill with Stormbreaker and swinging Stormbreaker accessory
Vision with interchangeable hands and blast accessories
Red Hulk with interchangeable hands
Illuminati Super Skrull with interchangeable hands, head and voice blast effect

Announced
Apocalypse
Blade
Iceman
Mister Fantastic
Invisible Woman

Disney Store Gift sets
All figures were also released individually.

Best of Marvel Select
"Best Of Marvel Select" allowed retailers to re-order popular, sold-out figures, sometimes repainted or repackaged. Arachne and the Skrull 3-Pack were originally offered in this configuration.

External links
 Marvelous News Database - Marvel Select Checklist
 DiamondSelectToys.com - official DST site
 ArtAsylum.com - official DST blog
 Facebook - Diamond Select's official Facebook page
 @CollectDST - Diamond Select's official Twitter account

References

Marvel Comics action figure lines